The Western Branch Elizabeth River is a  tidal river which bisects the city of Portsmouth, Virginia, in the United States.  It is a tributary of the Elizabeth River, part of the harbor of Hampton Roads in southeastern Virginia.

See also
List of rivers of Virginia

References

USGS Hydrologic Unit Map - State of Virginia (1974)

Rivers of Virginia
Rivers of Portsmouth, Virginia